Buddy Games is a 2019 American comedy film directed by Josh Duhamel in his solo directorial debut and written by Duhamel, Bob Schwartz, and Jude Weng. Produced by Duhamel, Michael J. Luisi, and Weng, the film centers on a group of six friends that reunite after a five-year hiatus to engage in a challenging set of dares and games and help lift one of their own out of depression and also have a chance of winning $150,000 while doing so. The cast includes Duhamel, Dax Shepard, Olivia Munn, Kevin Dillon, and Neal McDonough.

The project was originally announced in June 2017 as a deal with WWE Studios, with the cast joining shortly thereafter and filming commencing two months later in Vancouver. The film held its world premiere at the 2019 Mammoth Film Festival and Saban Films acquired distribution rights for the United States in July 2020. The film received mostly negative reviews from critics, with most criticism directed at the plot, humor, direction, and characters.

Plot
Every year Bob and his friends compete in the "Buddy Games," a series of fun and crazy obstacles meant to bring them closer together as friends. Shelly has won the competition six times, most recently defeating Bender in the final round via a paintball competition. During their drunk celebrations, Shelly teabags one of his friends who has passed out. Bender and Nikki (Shelly's wife) joke about shooting Shelly in the scrotum in retaliation for Shelly's drunk and egotistical behavior. It is later revealed that Bender aimed the gun at Shelly, but did not actually pull the trigger. Instead, Nikki pulled the trigger, shooting Shelly in the scrotum. Shelly eventually loses both of his testicles (which he keeps secret from his friends) as a result of the accident, but Bender takes the blame to save Shelly's failing marriage and as revenge for Shelly's mistreatment.

Five years later, Shelly is suicidal and has been admitted to the hospital. His marriage to Nikki has failed and he is now living with his mother. Shelly's mother calls Bob, now a successful and rich businessman, and orders him to start the Buddy Games again so that Shelly will have something to live for. When Bob suggests to Shelly they compete in the Buddy Games with their friends again, Shelly agrees to participate so long as Bob does not reveal to anyone that he lost both his testicles and that Bender not be invited. Bob agrees to these terms.

Bob calls all his friends (except for Bender) who all enthusiastically agree to participate. Bob's girlfriend is less than enthusiastic about Bob participating in the buddy games again, and after a fight she leaves via helicopter. Meanwhile, Bender finds out about the return of the Buddy Games from the other friends and surprises Bob at his mansion. To spare Bender's feelings for not being invited, Bob lies to Bender by telling him that to play in the Buddy Games this year, he will have to pay a $10,000 entry fee. Bob also reveals to Bender that Shelly lost both of his testicles in the accident, which shocks Bender.

Bob, Shelly and their friends then travel to a secluded cabin in the woods to participate in the Buddy Games, but Bender arrives unexpectedly. He announces that he was able to acquire the entry fee for the games by selling all of his late mother's possessions and giving hand-jobs to the homeless. He also reveals to the group that Shelly lost both of his testicles when he offers Shelly vials of his own sperm so that Shelly could have children if he wanted. Bob then reveals to Bender that he was not actually invited and that he had made up the entry fee so that Bender's feelings would not be hurt. Frustrated, Bender goads Bob into offering a cash prize of a hundred thousand dollars to the winner of the competition by relating how each of the friends, except for Bob, need the money. Shelly then begrudgingly accepts Bender in the competition.

The first day of the games includes an eating competition, a race on mini motorcycles, a water slide, a mud crawl competition, and a watermelon smash. Bob wins the first leg of the competition because Shelly misses the finishing line flag which is placed in the air after the water slide. In the next challenge each of the friends drink an entire bottle of laxatives before being tasked with picking up a woman at a bar. Bender wins the competition by tricking and teasing his friends. In the following competition, the friends smoke a joint and then strap a raw piece of steak to their heads. A komodo dragon is then released into the room and the friends compete to see who can stay the longest in the room. Shelly wins, seemingly losing his mind, and biting the dragon's tongue as it flicks at him.

Bob, Shelly, and Bender all advance to the final stage of the games. The night before the final competition, the friends celebrate by drinking pina coladas but unbeknownst to the rest of the group, Shelly has spiked these drinks with Bender's semen. The friends then watch a commercial which Durfy has appeared in, but mock it. Frustrated, Durfy wanders in the woods and is attacked by a rabid animal. Bob, Doc and Zane search for Durfy and upon finding him, convince him that he should continue acting by encouraging him to perform an impromptu scene.

Meanwhile, back at the cabin, Bender has fallen asleep and Shelly kidnaps him and duct tapes him to a tree. In the morning, Shelly destroys Bender's van (a gift from his late mother which he has been living in) by crashing it into a tree as revenge for shooting him. Bender then reveals that it was Nikki who shot Shelly.

The following day, the three finalists, Bender, Bob, and Shelly don protective gear and hunt each other in a field using bows. Bob's girlfriend, Tiffany arrives to support him but Bob is immediately eliminated by being shot in the hand. Bender and Shelly then face off and while Shelly is able to get the drop on Bender, Bender catches the arrow mid flight. Bender and Shelly then fight hand to hand, resulting in Bender winning the competition and the cash prize.

Bob's girlfriend then proposes to him stating that he must now be ready to move on from his friends and the Buddy Games, which Bob rejects. Enraged, Tiffany beats Bob, Doc, Zane, and Durfy while berating Bob for choosing his friends instead of her and leading her on for five years.

In the credits, Zane reveals that he is gay to Doc and Durfy secures a role on a CW show. Shelly, after avoiding all contact with Bender, is kidnapped by Bender who reveals that he has used part of his winnings to purchase a variety of artificial scrotums for Shelly.

Cast
 Josh Duhamel as Bobfather
 Olivia Munn as Tiffany
 James Roday Rodriguez as Zane Rockwell
 Kevin Dillon as Doc
 Dan Bakkedahl as Shelly
 Sheamus as Thursty
 Dax Shepard as Durfy
 Nick Swardson as Bender
 Neal McDonough as himself  
 Jensen Ackles as Jack Durfy (cameo role)

Production

The film was directed by Josh Duhamel in his directorial debut and co-written by Duhamel, Bob Schwartz, and Jude Weng. Filming began in August 2017 in Vancouver.

The casting of Sheamus and Nick Swardson was announced in June 2017, with Kevin Dillon, Dax Shepard, Olivia Munn, James Roday Rodriguez, and Dan Bakkedahl joining two months later.

Release
This film was released digitally on November 24, 2020.

Reception
On Metacritic, the film has a weighted average score of 22 out of 100, based on reviews from 6 critics, indicating "generally unfavorable reviews."

Cath Clarke of The Guardian gave the film a one out of five stars and described Buddy Games as "a buddy gross-out movie that’s unfunny and offensive in equal measures." Richard Roeper from The Chicago Sun-Times gave the film a one out of four stars and wrote that the film's "middle-aged, self-absorbed clowns are so repugnant and uninteresting and small-minded and awful, they make the gang from Tag look like the Knights of the Round Table," adding that it is a "legit contender for worst movie of 2020." Johnny Oleksinski for the New York Post gave the film a zero out of four stars and strongly criticized its lack of character development and pervasive toxic masculinity, concluding that "Buddy Games leaves you feeling dead inside."

The Hollywood Reporters Frank Scheck criticized the film as a "paean to arrested male adolescence" and faulted the screenwriters for sacrificing actual comedy for excessive gags, though he added that Dan Bakkedahl delivered an "undeniably vanity-free, no-holds-barred performance". Mick LaSalle from The San Francisco Chronicle gave a more positive outlook of the film and wrote that some of the film's greatest excitement came at its "nasty best" when it was "mere spectacle" and also paired with its "wicked sense of comedy," but acknowledged that the humor was generally lacking. He also praised Olivia Munn and lamented that her performance, described as the "best thing," was so sporadic in the film.

References

External links
 

2019 films
2019 comedy films
2019 directorial debut films
American comedy films
2010s English-language films
Films scored by Alex Wurman
Saban Films films
WWE Studios films
2010s American films